The Aryabhata Award or Aryabhatta Award is an annual award, presented to individuals with notable lifetime contributions in the field of astronautics and aerospace technology in India.

It was instituted by the Astronautical Society of India (ASI) (estd.1990), an International Astronautical Federation's member (since 1958). The award usually is presented by Minister of State in Prime Minister's Office. The award consists of a citation and Rs.One lakh in cash.

History 
The award is named after the fifth century Indian astronomer and mathematician Aryabhata, and in commemoration of the first Indian satellite Aryabhata (launched 19 April 1975).

Award winners 

 P. D. Bhavsar (1999)
 R.P. Shenoy (2000)
 Roddam Narasimha (2004)
 P.S. Goel (2005)
 Pramod Kale (2006)
 A. E. Muthunayagam (2010)
 V. K. Saraswat (2011)
 Ranganath R. Navalgund (2012)
 Avinash Chander (2016)

See also

 List of astronomy awards
 List of engineering awards
 List of physics awards
 List of space technology awards

References

Astronautics
Indian awards
Space-related awards
Engineering awards
Physics awards
Aryabhata Award
Science and technology in India
Space programme of India
Indian science and technology awards
Year of establishment missing